Deomali is a census town in Tirap district  in the state of Arunachal Pradesh, India. The small sub-divisional town has scenic beauty and is surrounded by hills, tea gardens, forests and rivers.

Geography
Deomali is located at 27.15857'N 95.47816'E .

Demographics
 Deomali had a population of 6,648. Males constitute 53% of the population and females 47%. Deomali has an average literacy rate of 81.86%, higher than the national average of 59.5%: male literacy is 86.77% and, female literacy is 76.71%. In Deomali, 12.20% of the population is under 6 years of age.
In 2001 Tirap Government College was shifted to Deomali from Khonsa and the present name of the college is Wangcha Rajkumar Government College.

Languages

According to Census 2011, Nocte is Spoken by 2,090 people, Bengali by 762, Assamese at 573, Nepali by 551 people, Bhojpuri by 462 people, Hindi at 452 people and Wancho at 316.

Tribes
Nocte is the major tribe in Deomali and its nearby villages, some small population of Wancho, Tutsa, Adi, Nyishi, Galo, Assamese, Bengali and Bihari are also present here.

Governance and Politics
Deomali is under 54th Namsang Assembly Constituency and it is one of the 60 Assembly Constituency of Arunachal Pradesh.
The current Member of legislative assembly is Wangki Lowang (February, 2019). Deomali is part of Arunachal East Lok Sabha Constitiency.

Media
Deomali has an All India Radio Relay station known as Akashvani Deomali. It broadcasts on FM frequencies.

Festivals
Festivals like Christmas, Durga Puja, Diwali, Magh Bihu, Shivratri, Holi etc. are celebrated with joy in Deomali but the main festival is Chalo Loku, the festival of Nocte tribe and it is celebrated on 25 November every year.

Education

There are many Government and Private educational institutions in Deomali Town, which are:

Schools
Ramakrishna Mission School, Narottam Nagar.
 Government Higher Secondary School.
 Government Middle School, NTC Colony.
 Government Upper Primary School, NCI Colony.
 Government Primary School, Natun Basti Colony.
 St. George School.
 Sun Hum Primary School.
 Ang Kids School.
 Good Sepherd School.
 Maa Sarada School, Narottam Nagar.
 Dayanand Arya Vidyapeeth.
 Arunachal Vikas Parishad Balwadi School.

Colleges

Wangcha Rajkumar Government College, Deomali.

Attractions
Chatjo River, St. George Catholic Church, Narottam Nagar and nearby villages are the best attractions in Deomali. In the month of November, tourists can witness the Chalo Loku festival which is celebrated by Noctes with great joy in Deomali.

Transport
Buses and cars operating from Deomali to other places are:

Deomali-Khonsa (Tata Sumo) 50 km
Deomali-Longding (Tata Sumo) 90 km
Deomali-Miao (APSTS Bus) 90 km
Deomali-Itanagar (Network Travels Bus & Deep Travels Bus) 290 km
Deomali-Tinsukia (APSTS Buses, Private Buses & Hired Cars) 60 km
Deomali-Margherita (APSTS Buses, Private Bus & Hired Cars) 20 km
Deomali-Dibrugarh (APSTS Buses & Hired Cars) 75 km
Deomali-Guwahati (Private Buses) 490 km

Direct buses and cars are available from Itanagar, Dibrugarh and Tinsukia to Deomali, but people travelling from other places via Guwahati can also reach Deomali through connecting buses or wingers which ply on daily basis from Tinsukia and Dibrugarh. The town of Deomali is connected to the closest state of Assam through Naharkatia in Dibrugarh district and also through Margherita in Tinsukia district. Both the towns Naharkatia and Margherita in Assam are at a distance of 20 km from Deomali, and these two towns cater Indian Railway services to the people of Deomali as well as to the people of Khonsa the district headquarters of Tirap. The nearest domestic airport is Mohanbari Airport at Dibrugarh which is 75 km away and can be travelled via Naharkatia-Duliajan route. Private cars travel in this area all day but regular bus or any other service to Deomali from Tinsukia and Dibrugarh are not available after 12 noon, and hence travelling in morning hours is a wise option.

Recently the Ministry of Railway has sanctioned eight new railway lines : Itakhola–Seijosa (18 km), Doomdooma –Namsai– Wakro (96 km), Dangri – Roing (60 km), Naharkatia – Deomali (20 km), Lekhapani-Nampong – New Khamlang – Deben (75 km), Tinsukia – Pasighat via Kanubari (300 km).

References

Tirap district
Cities and towns in Tirap district
Highest points of Indian states and union territories